Hum Sab Ullu Hain (Hindi: हम सब उल्लू हैं English: We all are owls) is an Indian 2015 Bollywood comedy film directed by T Manwani Anand and Tariq Bhat produced by Sona T Manwani under the Sona Enterprises banner. The film was released on 11 September 2015. Sources claim that Guddi Maruti had made her comeback to Bollywood after nine years in the film.

Cast
Upasana Singh
Rakesh Bedi
Rajesh Puri
Gavie Chahal
Guddi Maruti
Vishnu Sharma
Sunil Pal
Dinesh Hingoo
VIP
Pushpendrahttps://www.imdb.com/title/tt7901688/

Plot
Hum Sab Ullu Hain is a non-stop comedy film with a lot of comedy actors playing their central characters.

References

External links
 

2010s Hindi-language films
2015 films
Indian comedy films
Films shot in Mumbai